Ascope is a town in Northern Peru, capital of the province Ascope in the region La Libertad.

See also
Puerto Chicama
Chicama
El Brujo

References

Populated places in La Libertad Region